Rose-Chrétien de la Neuville (1741 - 17 July 1794) was a French Carmelite nun and one of the Martyrs of Compiègne.

Background
She married young but was widowed. She took vows as a choir nun in 1777, taking the religious name Julie Louise of Jesus. In 1794, de la Neuville was guillotined in Place du Trône Renversé in Paris.

On 27 May 1906, the Carmelite Martyrs of Compiègne were beatified by Pope Pius X.

References 

1741 births
1794 deaths
People from Eure
Discalced Carmelite nuns
French nuns executed by guillotine during the French Revolution
Burials at Picpus Cemetery
French beatified people
Carmelite beatified people
18th-century venerated Christians
Beatifications by Pope Pius X